Shoulder arthritis can be one of three types of arthritis in the glenohumeral joint of the shoulder.  The glenohumeral joint is a ball and socket joint, which relies on cartilage to move smoothly and to operate normally.

Forms
Shoulder arthritis is a clinical condition in which the joint that connects the ball of the arm bone (humeral head) to the shoulder blade socket (glenoid) has damaged or worn out cartilage. Normally the ends of the bone are covered with hyaline articular cartilage, a surface so smooth that the friction at the joint is less than that of an ice skate on ice. In arthritis, this cartilage is progressively lost, exposing the bone beneath. Shoulder arthritis is characterized by pain, stiffness, and loss of function and often by a grinding on shoulder motion.

One of the three forms of shoulder arthritis is osteoarthritis.  Osteoarthritis is the gradual wearing down of the joint cartilage that occurs predominantly in elderly people, and sometimes as the result of overuse in athletes.  Post-traumatic arthritis happens after a significant trauma is sustained by the joint, ruining the cartilage.  This could be the result of a car accident or after repeated trauma.  Rheumatoid arthritis is a disease where the body attacks its own cartilage and destroys it.  In each of these cases, cartilage is being destroyed.

Symptoms
The main symptom of shoulder arthritis is pain; this is due to the grinding of the bones against each other because of the lack of cartilage.  Pain usually occurs in the front of the shoulder and is worse with motion.  People with shoulder arthritis will also experience moderate to severe weakness, stiffness developing over many years, and the inability to sleep on the affected shoulder.

Diagnosis
Diagnosis is simple; usually a doctor can diagnose shoulder arthritis by symptoms, but they may ask for an x-ray or MRI for confirmation.

Treatment
Treatment of shoulder arthritis is usually aimed at reducing pain; there is no way to replace lost cartilage except through surgery.  Pain medicines available over-the-counter can be prescribed by the doctor, but another form of treatment is cryotherapy, which is the use of cold compression.  Some vitamin supplements have been found to prevent further deterioration; glucosamine sulfate is an effective preserver of cartilage.  Another way to prevent the further loss of cartilage would be to maintain motion in the shoulder, because once it is lost, it's difficult to regain.  Steps to reduce extreme pain in cases of bad shoulder arthritis can involve the doctor giving injections directly into the shoulder, usually consisting of a steroid mixed with an anesthetic, or even shoulder surgery.

For patients with severe shoulder arthritis that does not respond to non-operative treatment,  shoulder surgery can be very helpful. Depending on the condition of the shoulder and the specific expectations of the patient, surgical options include total shoulder joint replacement arthroplasty , ‘ream and run’ (humeral hemiarthroplasty with non prosthetic glenoid arthroplasty , and reverse (Delta) total shoulder joint replacement arthroplasty .

References

Arthritis